Peccari may refer to:

 Peccary (also javelina or skunk pig), a medium-sized hoofed mammal of the family Tayassuidae (New World pigs) in the suborder Suina
 Pecari, a genus of mammals in the peccary family, Tayassuidae